The Morris–Lecar model is a biological neuron model developed by Catherine Morris and Harold Lecar to reproduce the variety of oscillatory behavior in relation to Ca++ and K+ conductance in the muscle fiber of the giant barnacle . Morris–Lecar neurons exhibit both class I and class II neuron excitability.

History
Catherine Morris (b. 24 December 1949) is a Canadian biologist. She won a Commonwealth scholarship to study at Cambridge University, where she earned her PhD in 1977. She became a professor at the University of Ottawa in the early 1980s. As of 2015, she is an emeritus professor at the University of Ottawa. Harold Lecar (18 October 1935 – 4 February 2014) was an American professor of biophysics and neurobiology at the University of California Berkeley. He graduated with his PhD in physics from Columbia University in 1963.

Experimental method
The Morris–Lecar experiments relied on the voltage clamp method established by Keynes et al. (1973).

The principal assumptions underlying the Morris–Lecar model

Among the principal assumptions are these:

Equations apply to a spatially iso-potential patch of membrane. There are two persistent (non-inactivating) voltage-gated currents with oppositively biased reversal potentials. The depolarizing current is carried by Na+ or Ca2+ ions (or both), depending on the system to be modeled, and the hyperpolarizing current is carried by K+.
Activation gates follow changes in membrane potential sufficiently rapidly that the activating conductance can instantaneously relax to its steady-state value at any voltage.
The dynamics of the recovery variable can be approximated by a first-order linear differential equation for the probability of channel opening.

Physiological description
The Morris–Lecar model is a two-dimensional system of nonlinear differential equations.  It is considered a simplified model compared to the four-dimensional Hodgkin–Huxley model.

Qualitatively, this system of equations describes the complex relationship between membrane potential and the activation of ion channels within the membrane: the potential depends on the activity of the ion channels, and the activity of the ion channels depends on the voltage. As bifurcation parameters are altered, different classes of neuron behavior are exhibited.  is associated with the relative time scales of the firing dynamics, which varies broadly from cell to cell and exhibits significant temperature dependency.

Quantitatively:

where

Variables
  : membrane potential
  : recovery variable: the probability that the K+ channel is conducting

Parameters and constants
  : applied current
  : membrane capacitance
 : reference frequency

Bifurcations

See also
 Computational neuroscience
 Biological neuron model
 Hodgkin–Huxley model
 FitzHugh–Nagumo model
 Neural oscillations
 Nonlinear dynamics
 Quantitative models of the action potential

References

External links
A Morris–Lecar simulator
Scholarpedia: Morris–Lecar Model
Catherine Morris – Research Profile

Computational neuroscience